Thomas Jackson Baldrige (April 5, 1872January 27, 1964) was a Pennsylvania lawyer and judge.  He served part of a term as state Attorney General, and then on the state's Superior Court for over twenty years, the last two as President Judge.

Life and career

Baldrige was born the son of Howard Malcolm and Laura Mattern Baldrige.  His father was a prominent Blair County lawyer.  Baldrige attended Phillips Academy, Bucknell University, and the University of Pennsylvania Law School.  He read law with his father, and was admitted to the Blair County bar in 1895.

He married Anna P. Dean in 1917.

In 1910, he was appointed President Judge of the Blair County counts, and then elected for two ten-year terms.  In 1927, he resigned to become state Attorney General.  In 1929, he was appointed to the Superior Court of Pennsylvania, then elected later in 1929 and again in 1939 to ten-year terms.  In 1945, he was commissioned President Judge of the court, and then resigned in 1947, due to hearing.

Notable relatives
His father's older brother was Howard Hammond Baldrige, a Nebraska state senator,  Howard Hammond was the father of Howard Malcolm, a Nebraska congressman.  Howard Malcolm was the father of Howard Malcolm, Jr., and Letitia, Jacqueline Kennedy's Social Secretary.

References

Further reading

External links
 
 

1872 births
1964 deaths
People from Blair County, Pennsylvania
Phillips Academy alumni
Bucknell University alumni
University of Pennsylvania Law School alumni
Pennsylvania Attorneys General
Judges of the Superior Court of Pennsylvania
Pennsylvania lawyers